Beaumont Park is a suburb of Huddersfield, in the Metropolitan Borough of Kirklees, West Yorkshire, England that is located between Netherton, Crosland Moor and Lockwood.

The housing in this area is situated around the periphery of a medium-sized woodland and recreational park, known as 'Dungeon Wood' that was bequeathed to the people of Huddersfield in 1879 by the 'Beaumont's of Whitley' estate (Henry Fredrick Beaumont, for leisure purposes. Adjacent to the park is Beagle Woods, which is a popular venue for walkers. The wood is home to a kennels with a working pack of English Beagle hounds.

Public park
The park was officially opened on 13 October 1883, by Prince Leopold, fourth son of Queen Victoria, and his wife Princess Helena of Waldeck and Pyrmont (The Duke and Duchess of Albany). It was Huddersfield's first public park and is a fine example of a Victorian park. The park is maintained by Kirklees Council with assistance from a group of volunteers called the Friends of Beaumont Park who are interested in returning the grounds to their former glory, and have instigated many improvements to the park including a new bandstand and water cascades.

In 2011 the park was awarded a first 'Green Flag Award' by the Environmental charity Keep Britain Tidy organisation and has retained it each subsequent year.

See also
Listed buildings in Crosland Moor and Netherton

References

External links
Friends of Beaumont Park Official Website
Kirklees Council website - Beaumont Park

Areas of Huddersfield
Holme Valley